"Til You're Home" is a song performed by American singer-songwriter Rita Wilson with Latin pop singer Sebastián Yatra for the soundtrack of the 2022 comedy-drama film A Man Called Otto. It was written by Wilson and David Hodges, and released on December 2, 2022.

Background
After seeing a screener of the 2015 Swedish film A Man Called Ove, which was based on the novel of the same name by Fredrik Backman, Rita Wilson spent five years producing and developing an American adaptation, through her production company Artistic Films, to star her husband Tom Hanks. During pre-production for A Man Called Otto, director Marc Forster asked Wilson to write a song for the film. The resulting song, "Til You're Home", was written by Wilson and David Hodges. After hearing him on the Encanto soundtrack, Wilson asked Sebastián Yatra to appear on the track with her. The song is produced by Wilson and Matt Rollings.

The song is based on themes from the film, of aging, death, hope, love, loss, and the meaning of home. It was inspired in part by a conversation Wilson had with director Mike Nichols after her father died, about continuing to converse with a loved one after they die.

Release
The song and music video were released on December 2, 2022. The music video features Wilson and Yatra, as well as footage from the film. The soundtrack for A Man Called Otto, featuring "Til You're Home" along with composer Thomas Newman's score, will be released on Decca Records on December 30, 2022.

Accolades
"Til You're Home" was nominated for Best Song – Independent Film at the 2022 Hollywood in Music Media Awards. On December 21, 2022, it was announced that the song had been shortlisted for the Academy Award for Best Original Song at the 95th Academy Awards, but it wasn’t nominated.

Credits and personnel
Credits adapted from YouTube.

 Rita Wilson - vocals, songwriting, production
 Sebastián Yatra - vocals
 David Hodges - songwriting
 Matt Rollings - production, piano, celesta, background vocals
 George Doering - acoustic guitar
 David Levita - electric guitar
 Sean Hurley - bass
 Victor Indrizzo - drums
 Kristin Wilkinson - viola 
 Alma Fernandez - viola
 Charlie Bisharat - violin
 Alyssa Park - violin
 Sara Parkins - violin
 Jacob Braun - cello
 Giovanna Clayton - cello
 Niko Bolas - recording, mixing
 Ted Jensen - mastering

References 

2020s ballads
2022 songs
Sebastián Yatra songs